Excess Baggage is a 1997 American crime-comedy film written by Max D. Adams, Dick Clement, and Ian La Frenais, and directed by Marco Brambilla about a neglected young woman who stages her own kidnapping to get her father's attention, only to be actually kidnapped by a car thief. The film stars Alicia Silverstone (who was also an uncredited producer), Benicio del Toro, and Christopher Walken.

Plot

Emily Hope (Alicia Silverstone) stages her own kidnapping to get the attention of her wealthy, corrupt father. She puts herself in the trunk of her BMW 850i with taped legs and mouth, and handcuffs. After calling the police to come "rescue" her, a car thief named Vincent Roche (Benicio del Toro) unknowingly steals the car with her in it. Christopher Walken shows up as Emily's Uncle Ray, Jack Thompson as Emily's father and Harry Connick, Jr., as Greg, Vincent's car-stealing partner.

Background
The script for Excess Baggage was the winner of the first annual Austin Film Festival Screenplay Competition where it was picked up by Barry Josephson when he was at Sony.

Cast
 Alicia Silverstone as Emily Hope, a rich girl with a black belt in karate and a tendency for trouble. She had burned down her school library, perhaps to get the attention of her father when she was younger. Her relationship with her father is quite cold, but she has a solid friendship with her Uncle Ray and builds one with Vincent after he accidentally abducts her.
 Benicio del Toro as Vincent Roche, a successful and experienced car thief who supports himself with his work. He is referred to as "an innocent thief" who happens to steal the car with Emily in the trunk. After this his entire life is turned upside down as he gets implicated in several schemes and becomes dependent on his "hostage" to survive.
 Christopher Walken as Raymond "Uncle Ray" Perkins, Emily's uncle and cares for her well-being much more than her own father. He also suspects that this kidnapping situation is not a real kidnapping and might be one of Emily's "games" to get some much craved attention from her dad. His first encounters with Vincent are rather hostile, but the two eventually form a camaraderie.
 Jack Thompson as Alexander T. Hope, Emily's father and a very rich and successful businessman. He also pays little to no attention to his daughter, which often leads to her performing such outrageous stunts to get it as burning down her school library or staging her own kidnapping; these tend to backfire as the more effort she invests in trying to get him to pay attention to her, the less he sees fit to pay to her. It is hinted that his business deals may be corrupt.
 Harry Connick Jr. as Greg Kistler, Vincent's partner-in-crime, but it appears that Vincent does most of the work. They steal cars and sell them to people like Gus and Stick, which eventually lands them into trouble when their operation is burned down and Vincent is on the lam.
 Nicholas Turturro and Michael Bowen as Stick and Gus, two hoodlums who have had business transactions with Vincent and Greg but eventually turn on them.
 Leland Orser and Robert Wisden as Detectives Bernaby and Sims, two detectives who are investigating Emily's "kidnapping".
 Sally Kirkland as Louise Doucette, a bartender/waitress at a cafe near Vincent's home. Ray gets information about Vincent from her during his investigation of the kidnapping. She only appears in two scenes.

The film features cameo appearances by voice actor David Kaye and April Telek both of whom are uncredited.

Production
This was the first film produced by Alicia Silverstone under her production company First Kiss and was filmed in Vancouver and Victoria, British Columbia. Silverstone was nominated for a Razzie Award for Worst Actress where she lost to Demi Moore for G.I. Jane.

Casting
Benicio del Toro was hand-picked for the role by producer Silverstone after she had seen The Usual Suspects (1995). It is also reported that Silverstone and del Toro dated around the time of filming. Del Toro was nominated for an ALMA Award for Outstanding Individual Performance in a Crossover Role in a Feature Film.

Christopher Walken previously worked with del Toro in two other 1996 films, Basquiat and The Funeral. He would later star in Blast from the Past (1999) with Silverstone two years later. "I don't know why everybody thinks he's so crazy," Silverstone noted. "I think he seems so adorable. I think maybe I was his mom in a past life or something." Del Toro stated that the best advice he had ever been given regarding acting came from Walken: "When you're in a scene and you don't know what you're gonna do, don't do anything."

Reception
Excess Baggage debuted poorly in its opening weekend. By the end of its run, it had only grossed $14.5 million based on a $20 million budget.

The film received mostly mixed responses from critics and currently holds a 32% "Rotten" rating on Rotten Tomatoes. The site's consensus states: "Struggling to find a romantic spark in a seedy premise, Excess Baggage is weighed down by a lot of comedic dead weight." Clint Morris noted that the film "Outstays its welcome after a while, but Silverstone fans will still be in heaven - she's as cute as ever, and as cool as ever.". It received two thumbs up on the August 30, 1997 episode of Siskel & Ebert, with Gene Siskel labelling it "much better" than Brambilla's previous 1993 film Demolition Man. In his review for the Chicago Sun-Times, Roger Ebert stated that Silverstone was "wonderful" in Clueless, which was so entertaining that no followup could satisfy the audience. Ebert mentioned Silverstone is "OK" in Excess Baggage but "no better than OK" as he felt that she was miscast. James Berardinelli praised the cast but found the script "frustratingly ordinary and unambitious". Many critics praised Benicio del Toro's performance. Del Toro earned an ALMA Award nomination for his performance.

Home media
Excess Baggage was released on VHS and DVD in February 1998. It was released on Blu-ray by Mill Creek Entertainment in June 2019, as part of their "I Love the 90s" line. Reviews of the picture and sound quality for the 2019 release were negative, with it being labelled "heavily processed" and "a mess".

References

External links
 
 
 
 

1997 films
1990s crime comedy films
1990s comedy road movies
1997 romantic comedy films
American crime comedy films
American comedy road movies
American romantic comedy films
Columbia Pictures films
Films about kidnapping
Films directed by Marco Brambilla
Films set in Washington (state)
Films shot in Vancouver
Films with screenplays by Dick Clement
Films with screenplays by Ian La Frenais
1990s English-language films
1990s American films